Warren Conservation Park (formerly Warren National Park) is a protected area in the Australian state of South Australia located in the Adelaide Hills about  north-east of the state capital of Adelaide and about  south-east of Williamstown.

The conservation park consists of land in sections 118, 387 and 388 in the cadastral unit of the Hundred of Para Wirra and section 321 in the Hundred of Barossa. Land in sections 118, 387 and 388 first  gained protected area status as a wildlife reserve proclaimed under the Crown Lands Act 1929 on 14 July 1966. On 9 November 1967, the land in the wildlife reserve was proclaimed under the National Parks Act 1966 as the Warren National Park. On 27 November  1969, section 321 was added to the national park. On 27 April 1972, ithe national park was reconstituted as the Warren Conservation Park upon the proclamation of the National Parks and Wildlife Act 1972.

In 1980, it was described as follows:Warren Conservation Park is situated in rugged hilly country and receives over 750mm of rain annually.  The dominant plant community is an open forest of Eucalyptus obliqua and E. goniocalyx, which has a heath understorey.  Eucalyptus fasciculosa, E. huberana and E. leucoxylon are scattered throughout. Macropus fuliginosus (western grey kangaroo) is common in the park, while a walking trail traverses the length of the park.

The Zoothera dauma (scaly thrush), which is a threatened bird due to destruction of its habitat  ... , occurs in the park.  Together with Hale Conservation Park to the north, Warren Conservation Park contains unique geological exposures of a recently discovered unconformity between the Adelaidian sequence and a rejuvenated crystalline basement inlier.

The conservation park is classified as an IUCN Category III protected area.  In 1980, it was listed on the now-defunct Register of the National Estate.

See also
Protected areas of South Australia

References

External links
Official webpage
Warren Conservation Park webpage on the Protected Planet website
Warren Conservation Park webpage on the BirdsSA website

Conservation parks of South Australia
Adelaide Hills
South Australian places listed on the defunct Register of the National Estate